Íñigo Cervantes and Oriol Roca Batalla were the defending champions but chose not to defend his title.

Julian Lenz and Gerald Melzer won the title after defeating Nicolás Barrientos and Fernando Romboli 7–6(7–4), 7–6(7–3) in the final.

Seeds

Draw

References

External links
 Main draw

Lima Challenger - Doubles
2021 Doubles